Mircea Valerică Stan (born 3 August 1977) is a former Romanian footballer who played as a right back. His son, Antonio Stan, is also a footballer.

Stadionul Mircea Stan in Colonești, Olt is named after him.

Honours

Manager
Vedița Colonești
Liga III: 2020–21

References

External links
 
 

1977 births
Living people
Footballers from Bucharest
Romanian footballers
Association football defenders
Liga I players
Liga II players
FC Universitatea Cluj players
FCV Farul Constanța players
FC Argeș Pitești players
FC Brașov (1936) players
CS Mioveni players
Moldovan Super Liga players
FC Zimbru Chișinău players
Expatriate footballers in Moldova
Romanian expatriates in Moldova
Romanian expatriate sportspeople in Moldova